"Breath" is a song by American rock band Breaking Benjamin. It was released in January 2007 as the second single from their third album, Phobia. It was the band's fourth charted song on the US Hot 100 overall, and the second from Phobia. Although "Breath" failed to capture the pop success of "The Diary of Jane" at No. 50 where "Breath" hit No. 84 on the Billboard Hot 100, it was more successful on the rock charts where it hit No. 1 on the US Mainstream Rock Tracks chart, making it Breaking Benjamin's first number-one hit, staying there for seven weeks where "The Diary of Jane" hit No. 2 and it also hit No. 3 on the US Modern Rock Tracks chart, tying with "So Cold" as their highest-charting single on the chart where "The Diary of Jane" hit No. 4. The single was certified double platinum by the RIAA in August 24, 2022.

Versions 
The original version is the "Breath" off Phobia, which is 3:38 long. "Breath" also has a radio edit, which can be heard over public radio. The edit was mixed by Ian van Dahl. "Breath" was No. 6 on the top 40 mix edit charts of May 2008, it is 3:13 long. Generally, most active rock, mainstream rock and alternative rock stations still play the original version as of today. There is also another version of "Breath", but in a classical version. It is a cover song by Vitamin String Quartet and it's on the album Strung Out – The String Quartet Tribute to Hard Rock Hits, Vol. 4, which can be found on iTunes.

Track listing

Critical reception
Chuck Taylor of Billboard reviewed the song favorably, stating that its "foot-tapping beats and accessible melody are better appreciated when separated from its closely related siblings." He went on to say that the song has a "solid midtempo pace that peaks with another one of the band's climactic choruses."

Charts

Certifications

References

External links

2006 songs
2007 singles
Breaking Benjamin songs
Hollywood Records singles
Songs written by Benjamin Burnley
Song recordings produced by David Bendeth